Josef Sucharda (18 April 1883 – 19 January 1963) was a Czechoslovak sports shooter. He competed at the 1920 Summer Olympics and the 1924 Summer Olympics.

References

External links
 

1883 births
1963 deaths
Czechoslovak male sport shooters
Olympic shooters of Czechoslovakia
Shooters at the 1920 Summer Olympics
Shooters at the 1924 Summer Olympics
People from Jičín District
Sportspeople from the Hradec Králové Region